The Fourteenth Amendment may refer to:

 Fourteenth Amendment to the United States Constitution, which grants citizenship to everyone born in the U.S. and subject to its jurisdiction and protects civil and political liberties
 Fourteenth Amendment of the Constitution of Ireland, which guarantees free access to information on abortion in other countries
 Fourteenth Amendment of the Constitution of India
 Fourteenth Amendment to the Constitution of Pakistan, which gave party leaders the power to dismiss dissenting members of parliament
 Fourteenth Amendment of the Constitution of South Africa, which repealed some of the provisions allowing for floor-crossing, that had been added by the Ninth and Tenth Amendments